The Arthur River (Peerapper: Tunganrick) is a major perennial river located in the north-west region of Tasmania, Australia.

Location and features
The river is joined by 25 tributaries including the Waratah, Wandle, Hellyer, Keith, Lyons, Rapid, Julius, Salmon and Frankland rivers. The Arthur River reaches its mouth at the settlement of  where it empties into the Southern Ocean. The river descends  over its  course.

The river was named in honour of Sir George Arthur, the Lieutenant Governor of Van Diemens Land between  1824 and 1836.

On the coast near the river mouth is a plaque titled The Edge of the World. North West Coast Tasmania, and a poem by tourism pioneer Brian Inder, who coined the term, referring to the coastline at Arthur River which is regularly lashed by the gales of the Roaring Forties.

See also

Rivers of Tasmania

References

Rivers of Tasmania
North West Tasmania